Nea Smyrni (Néa Smýrni, "New Smyrna") is a municipality in South Athens, Greece. At the 2011 census, it had 73,076 inhabitants. It was named after the former Greek city Smyrna (today's İzmir in Turkey), whence many refugees arrived and settled in the Nea Smyrni area following the 1922 catastrophe of Asia Minor and the Great fire of Smyrna, as a result of the Greco-Turkish war..

History

Although there are few details about the ancient history of the area, in 2012, during works, ancient graves were unearthed on the side of Agias Sofias Street. The specific manner of burial is known as 'burial by the roadside'. These ancient findings have already been unveiled by public authorities and are able to be visited.

Nea Smyrni began to be inhabited at the beginning of the 20th century. Up until that point, it had not been inhabited in a systematic manner. At the time, it was intersected by an avenue which connected Athens and Phalerum, the ancient port of the city.

After the Asia Minor Disaster, the government decided to construct a settlement in the area for the refugees from Smyrna. Construction of this settlement began in 1926. In 1928, the population was just 210. By 1933, the area had become a true town with a population of 6,500. By 1940, there were 15,000 inhabitants. In 1944, with the end of the war, Nea Smyrni became a municipality.

Nea Smyrni was the site of multiple clashes between British Army forces and ELAS resistance forces during the so-called Dekemvriana of 1944.

After the civil war, Nea Smyrni was incorporated into Athens.

Geography

The municipality has an area of 3.524 km2. Its built-up area is continuous with those of central Athens and the neighboring suburbs. It is the second-most densely populated municipality in Greece, following Kallithea, and one of the most densely populated cities in the world. The main thoroughfare is Andrea Syngrou Avenue, which forms the northwestern border of the municipality and connects it with central Athens and the coast.

Alsos Neas Smyrnis 

Alsos Neas Smyrnis (Alsos meaning 'grove' or 'small wood') has an area of fifty acres and is bounded by Eleftheriou Venizelou, Ephesou, Kordeliou and Patriarchou Ioakeim III Avenues. The Alsos consists mainly (20%) of woodland trees (Aleppo pine, stone pine, cypress etc.) and ornamental trees (20%). In addition, most of this green space is covered in shrubs (cranberry, velvetleaf, myoporum and pyracantha). Today, conifers make up about 60% of the plant capacity. The plant material of the Alsos consists mainly of monoculture and introduced plants planted in very high density. Two fountains complete the architectural makeup of the area. The whole park is surrounded by iron railings.

Sporting teams
The sport clubs based in Nea Smyrni are Panionios G.S.S., multisport club founded in Smyrna, in 1890 and AONS Milon, multisport club founded in 1928.

Climate 

Nea Smyrni, owing to the proximity to the Athens Riviera, has a hot semi-arid climate. It has mild winters and hot summers, with particularly warm summer nights. The driest months are July and August while the rainiest period is during the fall. According to the National Observatory of Athens station, Nea Smyrni records the highest mean annual temperature in Continental Europe the past few years.

Sites of interest
Nea Smyrni Stadium, built in 1939, renovated in 1988. Panionios FC plays in the stadium.
Nea Smyrni Indoor Hall, holds up to 1,832 persons.
Nea Smyrni Square (Greek: Πλατεία Νέας Σμύρνης Platía Néas Smýrnis).
Nea Smyrni Park, a 5-hectare centrally located park with about 40% trees.
Estia Nea Smyrni, a cultural association.

Neighbourhoods
 Faros
 Agia Fotini
 Alsos
 Kendro (Center)
 Chrisaki
 Agia Paraskevi
 Mitilineika
 Loutra
 Ano Nea Smyrni (Upper Nea Smyrni)

Churches

 Agia Fotini
 Agia Paraskevi
 Agioi Anargiroi
 Agios Charalambos
 Agios Andreas
 Agioi Theodoroi (Greek Old Calendarists)
 Taxiarches (cemetery church)

Nea Smyrni is the seat of a similarly-titled metropolitan diocese. The current Metropolitan bishop of Nea Smyrni is Simeon Koutsas.

Notable people
Polina, singer
Constantine Psachos, musician
Makis Angelopoulos, businessman

Twin towns – sister cities
 Sisian, Armenia (since 2004)

Historical population

See also
List of municipalities of Attica

References

 
Municipalities of Attica
Populated places in South Athens (regional unit)
Occupation of Smyrna